Lutsk Castle (Lutskyi zamok, Polish: Zamek w Łucku), also locally known as Liubart's Castle (Замок Любарта, Zamok Liubarta) or Upper Castle (Верхній замок, Verkhnii zamok), began its life in the mid-14th century as the fortified seat of Gediminas' son Liubartas (Lubart), the last ruler of united Galicia-Volhynia. It is the most prominent landmark of Lutsk, Ukraine and as such appears on the 200 hryvnia bill. (Another city castle, called Lower Castle, built by the Czartoryski family since the 14th century, is now a ruin.)

The Kievan town of Luchesk had a wooden wall as early as 1075, when Boleslaus the Bold laid siege to it for six months. Yury Dolgoruky failed to take Lutsk after a six-weeks siege in 1149. In 1255, the walls of Lutsk were stormed by Khan Jochi's grandson Kuremsa.

The current castle, towering over the Styr River, was built mostly in the 1340s, although some parts of the earlier walls were used. It repelled sieges by numerous potentates, including Casimir the Great (1349), Jogaila (1431), and Sigismund Kęstutaitis (1436). It was there that the Lutsk Conference of 1429 took place, attended by Emperor Sigismund, Vasily II of Moscow, Jogaila, Vytautas the Great, and the voivode of Wallachia.

During the long reign of Vytautas, Lutsk Castle was further fortified to guard against artillery and gunfire. The principal entrance, now bricked in, was from the west and adjoined a bridge over outer moat. Three main towers, now named "Lubart", "Švitrigaila" (both after Lithuanian princes) and the "Bishop", were built up in the course of the 16th and 17th centuries.

The walls of the castle formerly enclosed St. John's Cathedral, a palace of the grand dukes, and an episcopal palace. Of these buildings, only the Neoclassical palace of the bishops still stands.

On 2 July 1941 1,160 Jews were murdered within the walls of the castle. There is no monument or marker for this tragedy in the castle.

References

 Памятники градостроительства и архитектуры Украинской ССР. Киев: Будивельник, 1983—1986. Том 2, с. 48.

External links

Castles in Ukraine
Buildings and structures in Lutsk
Gothic architecture in Ukraine
Tourist attractions in Lutsk
Castles of the Grand Duchy of Lithuania
Holocaust locations in Ukraine